Prince Edward—Hastings was a provincial electoral district in Ontario, Canada, that was represented in the Legislative Assembly of Ontario from 1999 to 2018. Its population in 2006 was 113,227.

History

The provincial electoral district was created in 1999 when provincial ridings were defined to have the same borders as federal ridings. It initially consisted of the County of Prince Edward, and the part of the County of Hastings lying south of and including the townships of Hungerford, Huntingdon and Rawdon, south of but excluding the Village of Stirling, and excluding the City of Trenton.

In 2003, it was redefined to consist of the County of Prince Edward and the County of Hastings (except the City of Quinte West).

For the 2018 election, the district was dissolved into Bay of Quinte and Hastings—Lennox and Addington.

Members of Provincial Parliament

Election results

2007 electoral reform referendum

References

Sources
Elections Ontario Past Election Results

Belleville, Ontario
Former provincial electoral districts of Ontario